Local government is a generic term for the lowest tiers of public administration within a particular sovereign state. This particular usage of the word government refers specifically to a level of administration that is both geographically localised and has limited powers. While in some countries, "government" is normally reserved purely for a national administration (government) (which may be known as a central government or federal government), the term local government is always used specifically in contrast to national government – as well as, in many cases, the activities of sub-national, first-level administrative divisions (which are generally known by names such as cantons, provinces, states, oblasts, or regions).  Local governments generally act only within powers specifically delegated to them by law and/or directives of a higher level of government. In federal states, local government generally comprises a third or fourth tier of government, whereas in unitary states, local government usually occupies the second or third tier of government.

The question of municipal autonomy is a key question of public administration and governance. Local elections are held in many countries. The institutions of local government vary greatly between countries, and even where similar arrangements exist, the terminology often varies. Common designated names for local government entities include state, province, region, canton, department, county, prefecture, district, city, township, town, borough, parish, municipality, shire, village, ward, local service district and local government area.

Africa

Egypt 

Egypt has a centralised system of local government officially called local administration as it is a branch of the Executive.  The country is divided into 27 governorates, the top tier of local administration. A governorate is administered by a governor, who is appointed by the President of Egypt and serves at the president's discretion.

Governors have the civilian rank of minister and report directly to the prime minister, who chairs the Board of Governors and meets with them on a regular basis. The Minister of Local Development coordinates the governors and their governorate's budgets.

Mali

In recent years, Mali has undertaken an ambitious decentralization program, which involves the capital district of Bamako, seven regions subdivided into 46 cercles, and 682 rural community districts (communes). The state retains an advisory role in administrative and fiscal matters, and it provides technical support, coordination, and legal recourse to these levels. Opportunities for direct political participation, and increased local responsibility for development have been improved.

In August–September 1998, elections were held for urban council members, who subsequently elected their mayors. In May/June 1999, citizens of the communes elected their communal council members for the first time. Female voter turnout was about 70% of the total, and observers considered the process open and transparent. With mayors, councils, and boards in place at the local level, newly elected officials, civil society organizations, decentralized technical services, private sector interests, other communes, and donor groups began partnering to further development.

Eventually, the cercles will be reinstituted (formerly grouping arrondissements) with a legal and financial basis of their own. Their councils will be chosen by and from members of the communal councils. The regions, at the highest decentralized level, will have a similar legal and financial autonomy, and will comprise a number of cercles within their geographical boundaries. Mali needs to build capacity at these levels, especially to mobilize and manage financial resources.

Nigeria 

Nigeria as a federal republic operates three tiers of government: federal (or central), states 
and local government. The country's constitution provides for each local government (which exists in a single tier countrywide), and its development areas and autonomous communities created by individual state legislation to have democratically elected local government heads. There is a ministry (or bureau) of local government and chieftaincy affairs in each state charged with the responsibility of administration at that level. Nigeria has a total of 774 Local Government Areas 
(LGAs).

South Africa

South Africa has a two-tiered local government system comprising local municipalities which fall into district municipalities, and metropolitan municipalities which span both tiers of local government.

Asia

Afghanistan
Afghanistan was traditionally divided into provinces governed by centrally appointed governors with considerable autonomy in local affairs. There are currently 34 provinces. During the Soviet occupation and the development of country-wide resistance, local areas came increasingly under the control of mujaheddin groups that were largely independent of any higher authority; local commanders, in some instances, asserted a measure of independence also from the mujaheddin leadership in Pakistan, establishing their own systems of local government, collecting revenues, running educational and other facilities, and even engaging in local negotiations. Mujaheddin groups retained links with the Peshawar parties to ensure access to weapons that were doled out to the parties by the government of Pakistan for distribution to fighters inside Afghanistan.

The Taliban set up a shura (assembly), made up of senior Taliban members and important tribal from the area. Each shura made laws and collected taxes locally. The Taliban set up a provisional government for the whole of Afghanistan, but it did not exercise central control over the local shuras.

The process of setting up the transitional government in June 2002 by the Loya Jirga took many steps involving local government. First, at the district and municipal level, traditional shura councils met to pick electors—persons who cast ballots for Loya Jirga delegates. Each district or municipality had to choose a predetermined number of electors, based on the size of its population. The electors then traveled to regional centers and cast ballots, to choose from amongst themselves a smaller number of loya jirga delegates— according to allotted numbers assigned to each district. The delegates then took part in the Loya Jirga.

The warlords who rule various regions of the country exert local control. The transitional government is attempting to integrate local governing authorities with the central government, but it lacks the loyalty from the warlords necessary to its governing authority. More traditional elements of political authority—such as Sufi networks, royal lineage, clan strength, age-based wisdom, and the like—still exist and play a role in Afghan society. Karzai is relying on these traditional sources of authority in his challenge to the warlords and older Islamist leaders. The deep ethnic, linguistic, sectarian, tribal, racial, and regional cleavages present in the country create what is called "Qawm" identity, emphasizing the local over higher-order formations. Qawm refers to the group to which the individual considers himself to belong, whether a subtribe, village, valley, or neighborhood. Local governing authority relies upon these forms of identity and loyalty.

Armenia

Armenia is subdivided into eleven administrative divisions. Of these, ten are provinces, known as marzer or in the singular form marz in Armenian.

Azerbaijan

Azerbaijan is administratively divided into the following subdivisions:
59 districts (rayonlar; sing.– rayon), 
11 cities (şəhərlər; sing.– şəhər), 
1 autonomous republic (muxtar respublika), which itself contains:
7 districts
1 city

The rayons are further divided into municipalities (Bələdiyyə).

Bangladesh

Bangladesh is divided into eight administrative divisions, each named after their respective divisional headquarters: Barisal, Chittagong, Dhaka, Khulna, Rajshahi, Sylhet, Rangpur and Mymensingh Division.

Divisions are divided into zila. There are 64 zila in Bangladesh, each further divided into upazila or thana. The area within each police station, except for those in metropolitan areas, is divided into several unions, with each union consisting of multiple villages. In the metropolitan areas, police stations are divided into wards, which are further divided into mahallas. There are no directly elected officials at the divisional or district levels, although elected chairs of subdistricts also sit on district councils. Direct elections are held for each union (or ward), electing a chairperson and a number of members. In 1997, a parliamentary act was passed to reserve three seats (out of 12) in every union for female candidates.

Dhaka is the capital and largest city of Bangladesh. The cities with a city corporation, having mayoral elections, include Dhaka South, Dhaka North, Chittagong, Khulna, Sylhet, Rajshahi, Barisal, Rangpur, Comilla and Gazipur. Other major cities, these and other municipalities electing a mayor and councilors for each ward, include Mymensingh, Gopalganj, Jessore, Bogra, Dinajpur, Saidapur, Narayanganj, Naogaon and Rangamati. Both the municipal heads are elected for a span of five years.

Brunei Darussalam 
The administrative divisions of Brunei mainly consist of daerah, mukim and kampung or kampong. They are organised hierarchically, with daerah being the first level and kampong the third level. All the administrative divisions are under direct governance of the government through the Ministry of Home Affairs. There are four districts in Brunei: Brunei-Muara, Belait, Tutong and Temburong. The administrative level of mukim lies below the district. At present, there are 38 mukims, with 17 in Brunei-Muara, 8 in Tutong, 8 in Belait and 5 in Temburong District. A mukim is headed by a penghulu. A village (Malay: kampung or kampong) is the lowest administrative level in Brunei and headed by a ketua kampong or village head. Its population varies from a few hundreds to tens of thousands.

Cambodia

China

Georgia

The subdivisions of Georgia are autonomous republics (avtonomiuri respublika), regions (მხარე, mkhare), and municipalities (მუნიციპალიტეტი, munits'ipaliteti).

India

Indonesia

Iran

Iraq

Israel

The Israeli Ministry of Interior recognizes four types of local government in Israel: 
Cities: 71 single-level urban municipalities, usually with populations exceeding 20,000 residents.
Local councils: 141 single-level urban or rural municipalities, usually with populations between 2,000 and 20,000.
Regional Councils: 54 bi-level municipalities which govern multiple rural communities located in relative geographic vicinity. The number of residents in the individual communities usually does not exceed 2000. There are no clear limits to the population and land area size of Israeli regional councils.
Industrial councils: Two single-level municipalities which govern large and complex industrial areas outside cities. The local industrial councils are Tefen in Upper Galilee (north of Karmiel) and Ramat Hovav in the Negev (south of Beer Sheva).

Japan

Since the Meiji restoration, Japan has had a local government system based on prefectures. The national government oversees much of the country. Municipal governments were historical villages. Now mergers are common for cost effective administration. There are 47 prefectures. They have two main responsibilities. One is mediation between national and municipal governments. The other is area wide administration.

Kazakhstan

Korea, North

Korea, South

Malaysia

Local government is the lowest level in the system of government in Malaysia—after federal and state. It has the power to collect taxes (in the form of assessment tax), to create laws and rules (in the form of by-laws) and to grant licenses and permits for any trade in its area of jurisdiction, in addition to providing basic amenities, collecting and managing waste and garbage as well as planning and developing the area under its jurisdiction.

Myanmar

Nepal

Gaunpalika (Rural Council) and Nagarpalika (Municipal council) are the local level divisions in Nepal. Which is ruled by third level of government after Federal and Provincial government. In Nepal there are total 753 local levels government (including 6 Metropolises, 11 Sub-metropolises, 276 Municipalities and 460 Gaunpalikas). And there are total 6,743 wards are formed under these 753 local levels. These local government are ruled by local leaders and the Mayor is the supreme of each local government which is elected every 5 (Five) year by local public.

Pakistan

Local government is the third tier of government in Pakistan, after Federal Government and Provincial Government. There are three types of administrative unit of local government in Pakistan:

 District Government Administrations
 Town Municipal Administrations
 Union Council Administrations

There are over five thousand local governments in Pakistan. Since 2001, these have been led by democratically elected local councils, each headed by a Nazim (the word means "supervisor" in Urdu, but is sometimes translated as Mayor). Some districts, incorporating large metropolitan areas, are called City Districts. A City District may contain subdivisions called Towns and Union Councils. Council elections are held every four years. District Governments also include a District Coordination Officer (DCO), who is a civil servant in-charge of all devolved departments. Currently, the Powers of Nazim are also held by the DCO.

Palestinian Authority
Local government in the Palestinian National Authority-controlled areas are divided into three main groups: Municipal councils, village council and local development committees.
 Municipality (Palestinian Authority): Depends on size of locality. Localities that serve as the centers of governorates and populations over 15,000 have 15-member councils. Localities with populations over 15,000 residents have 13-member councils and localities with populations between 4,000 and 15,000 have 9-member councils.
 Village Council (Palestinian Authority): Localities with populations between 800 and 1,500 have 3-member councils while those between 1,500 and −4,000 residents have 7-member councils.

Philippines

The Local Government Code of 1991 provides for the three levels of Local Government Units or LGUs in the Philippines: (1) the province (2) city and municipality, and (3) the barangay. The country remains a unitary state and the National Government continues to have strong influence over local government units.

A province is led by a governor along with the Sangguniang Panlalawigan (Provincial Council) composed of board members. A mayor leads a city or municipality while the Sangguniang Panlungsod (City Council) and the Sangguniang Bayan (Municipal Council) constitute the legislative branches of a city and municipality, respectively. A barangay is headed by the Barangay Captain and the Barangay Council.  Barangays can be further divided into puroks and sitios but their leadership is unelected.

The 1987 Philippine Constitution also provides for the existence of autonomous regions. The Bangsamoro Autonomous Region in Muslim Mindanao (BARMM) is the only autonomous region in the Philippines.  There was an attempt to institute an autonomous region in the Cordillera, but that failed and instead the Cordillera Administrative Region (CAR) was established.

Local governments have limited taxing authority. Most of their funds come from the national government via the Internal Revenue Allotment

Saudi Arabia
There are three levels of local government in the Kingdom of Saudi Arabia: the city council, the municipal council and the municipality.

The city council is the highest level of local government. The municipal councils began in 2005 and is the second level of local government. The municipality is the third level of local government. There are 178 municipalities across the kingdom. The first began in Jeddah during the Othmanic period. Each municipality is run by its city's mayor. As a collective the kingdom's municipalities make up the Ministry of Municipality and Rural Affairs (MoMRA).

Sri Lanka

Syria

Taiwan

The Republic of China government in Taiwan consists of special municipality governments, provincial city governments and county governments for their local governments. They also have councils in each of those three local government levels.

Tajikistan

Thailand

Turkey

Turkey has two levels of local government; provinces (Turkish: iller ) and districts (Turkish: ilçeler ).

The territory of Turkey is subdivided into 81 provinces for administrative purposes. The provinces are organized into 7 regions for census purposes; however, they do not represent an administrative structure. Each province is divided into districts, for a total of 957 districts.

United Arab Emirates

Uzbekistan

Vietnam
Vietnam has 3 levels of local government:
First tier: provinces and municipalities
Second tier: provincial cities, towns, urban districts and rural districts
Third tier: wards, communes and townships

Each level has a People's Committee (executive – up to third tier), a People's Council (legislative – up to third tier) and a People's Court (judiciary – up to second tier)

Yemen

Europe

Albania

Since its Declaration of Independence from the Ottoman Empire in 1912, Albania has reformed its internal divisions 21 times. Before the implementation of the 1998 Constitution, the primary division was into about 36 districts, whose number, size, and importance varied over time. Following their abolishment in the year 2000, the counties were divided into urban and rural municipalities until the 2015 elections, when they were replaced by the current system.

Presently, Albania has 34 levels of local government :
 12 counties, sometimes known as prefectures or administrative divisions
 61 municipalities
 373 administrative units, sometimes known as communes, which also oversee about 3,000 villages

The prefects who oversee each county are appointed by the central government, but the mayors of the municipalities and the local government councils are elected democratically.

Andorra
Andorra is formed by seven parishes (parròquies, singular – parròquia); Andorra la Vella, Canillo, Encamp, La Massana, Escaldes-Engordany, Ordino, Sant Julià de Lòria.

Some parishes have a further territorial subdivision. Ordino, La Massana and Sant Julià de Lòria are subdivided into quarts (quarters), while Canillo is subdivided into 10 veïnats (neighborhoods). Those mostly coincide with villages, which are found in all parishes. Each parish has its own elected mayor who is the nominal head of the local government known as a comú in Catalan.

Belarus

At the top level of administration, Belarus is divided into six regions and the city of Minsk, which has a special status being the capital of Belarus. Minsk is also the capital of Minsk Region.

At the second level, the regions are divided into raions ("districts").

Bulgaria

Since the 1880s, the number of territorial management units in Bulgaria has varied from seven to 26. Between 1987 and 1999 the administrative structure consisted of nine provinces (oblasti, singular oblast). A new administrative structure was adopted in parallel with the decentralisation of the economic system. It includes 27 provinces and a metropolitan capital province (Sofia-Grad). All areas take their names from their respective capital cities. The provinces subdivide into 264 municipalities.

Municipalities are run by mayors, who are elected to four-year terms, and by directly elected municipal councils. Bulgaria is a highly centralised state, where the national Council of Ministers directly appoints regional governors and all provinces and municipalities are heavily dependent on it for funding.

Croatia

Croatia is divided into 20 counties and the capital city of Zagreb, the latter having the authority and legal status of a county and a city at the same time. The counties subdivide into 127 cities and 429 municipalities.

Czech Republic

The highest tier of local government in the Czech Republic are the thirteen regions (Czech: kraje, singular kraj) and the capital city of Prague. Each region has its own elected Regional Assembly (krajské zastupitelstvo) and hejtman (usually translated as hetman or governor). In Prague, their powers are executed by the city council and the mayor.

The regions are divided into seventy-six districts (okresy, singular okres) including three "statutory cities" (without Prague, which had special status). The districts lost most of their importance in 1999 in an administrative reform; they remain as territorial divisions and seats of various branches of state administration. A further reform in effect since January 2003 created 204 Municipalities with Extended Competence (obce s rozšířenou působností); also obce III. stupně – third-level municipalities, unofficially also called "little districts" (Czech: 'malé okresy') which took over most of the administration of the former district authorities. Some of these are further divided between Municipalities with Commissioned Local Authority (obce s pověřeným obecním úřadem, shortened to pověřená obec, pl. pověřené obce; "second-level municipalities").  In 2007 the borders of the districts were slightly adjusted, and 119 municipalities are now within different districts.

Denmark

For local government purposes, Denmark is divided into five regions, with their most important area of responsibility being the public health service. They are also responsible for employment policies, and some regions are responsible for public mass transit. Regions are not entitled to levy their own taxes, and they rely entirely on central state funding (around 70%) and funding coming from the municipalities (around 30%). Regions are led by directly elected councils (regionsråd). They consist of 41 members each.

The regions are further divided into 98 municipalities (kommuner). Elections for the municipalities are held on the third Tuesday of November every four years.

Estonia

Estonia is divided into 79 municipalities (omavalitsus), and each municipality is a unit of self-government with its representative and executive bodies. Furthermore, the country is also divided into fifteen counties, each of which were used to be led by a county governor (maavanem), who represents the national government at the regional level. This although changed with 2017 administrative reform.

Finland

The most important administrative layer of local government in Finland are the 311 municipalities, which may also call themselves towns or cities. They account for half of public spending. Spending is financed by municipal income tax, property tax, state subsidies, and other revenue.

In addition to municipalities, there are two intermediate levels of local government. Municipalities co-operate in seventy-four sub-regions and nineteen regions. These are governed by the member municipalities and have only limited powers. However, the autonomous province of Åland has a directly elected regional council, and the Sami people have a semi-autonomous Sami Domicile Area in Lapland for issues on language and culture.

France

According to its Constitution of 1958, France has 3 levels of local government:
13 Régions (including Corsica) and 5 Régions d'outre-mer (Réunion, Martinique, Mayotte, Guadeloupe and French Guiana). Corsica is not referred to as a "région" but simply as a "collectivité territoriale", that merely means "local government area".
96 départements and 5 départements d'outre-mer (Réunion, Guadeloupe, Martinique, Mayotte and French Guiana). Paris is both a commune and a département.
There are 36,679 municipalities (in French: Communes).

However, in addition to the constitutional clauses of 1958, there now exist specificities:
Intercommunalities are now a level of government between municipalities and departments.
There exist 2 "pays d'outre-mer": French Polynesia and New Caledonia. The expression "pays d'outre-mer" is convenient as it can be understood in French as both "overseas country" and "overseas county/traditional area" (as evidenced by Pays de la Loire that is a home région, not a home "country"). French Polynesia works as an autonomous région, whereas New Caledonia has a sui generis local government status with specific institutions and even more autonomy.

Germany

Greece

Since 1 January 2011, Greece consists of thirteen regions subdivided into a total of 325 municipalities and communities. The regions have their own elected governors and regional councils, however there are seven decentralized administrations, which group from one to three regions under a government-appointed general secretary. There is also one autonomous area, Mount Athos.

Hungary

For local government, Hungary is divided into 19 counties. In addition, the capital (főváros), Budapest, is independent of any county government

The counties are further subdivided into 174 subregions (kistérségek), and Budapest is its own subregion.

There are also 23 towns with county rights (singular megyei jogú város). The local authorities of these towns have extended powers, but these towns belong to the territory of the respective county instead of being independent territorial units.

Iceland

The Municipalities of Iceland are local administrative areas in Iceland that provide a number of services to their inhabitants such as kindergartens, elementary schools, waste management, social services, public housing, public transportation, services to senior citizens and handicapped people. They also govern zoning and can voluntarily take on additional functions if they have the budget for it. The autonomy of municipalities over their own matters is guaranteed by the constitution of Iceland.

The municipalities are governed by municipal councils which are directly elected every four years. The sizes of these councils vary from five members in the smallest municipalities to fifteen in the largest one. Most municipalities except for the very small ones hire an executive manager who may or may not be a member of the municipal council. These managers are usually referred to as mayors (bæjarstjóri / borgarstjóri) in the mostly urban municipalities but "commune manager" (sveitarstjóri) in the rural or mixed municipalities.

Ireland
 The Republic of Ireland's local government is laid out by the Local Government Reform Act 2014. With a few exceptions, local government is two-tier. At the lowest level are the municipal, metropolitan or borough councils, which are elected during local elections. These councillors from the relevant county then together form the council, termed either County or City and County Councils. For example, the 4 municipal districts in Westmeath County each elect their own councils, who together form Westmeath County Council. Many functions are performed by the Chief Executive, who is appointed by the Minister for Local Government.

The exceptions to the above is the county of Dublin and the cities of Cork and Galway, the later two's councils are directly elected with no lower council. Dublin county is made up of four local area authorities, each elected directly. There are thirty-one local authorities.

The main sources of funding for local government in Ireland are local property and motor tax revenues, payments from the Exchequer, charges for goods and services, and state grants.

Isle of Man

Local government on the Isle of Man is partly based on the ancient parishes. There are four types of local authorities: a borough corporation, town commissioners, village commissioners, and parish commissioners.

Italy
The Constitution of Italy defines three levels of local government:
Regions: they were first acknowledged after the birth of the Italian republic in 1948. Numbering 20, they acquired a significant degree of autnomy after a constitutional reform was passed in 2001. Furhtermore, 5 of them (namely Valle d'Aosta, Friuli-Venezia Giulia, Trentino-Alto Adige, Sardinia and Sicily) have a special status and are given even more power than the 15 others.
Provinces: they were the only local bodies in effect during the Kingdom of Italy (from the unification of Italy in 1861 to the birth of the Republic in 1948). Consequently, they used to serve many functions, but these were reduced as Regions absorbed more and more competences. Nowadays they number 107 and mostly care to roads, school buildings, and local zoning and planning. Finally, from 2015 onwards, 14 provinces officially became metropolitan cities.
Communes: The Mayor and staff, caring for the needs of a single town or of a village and neighbouring minor towns or villages.

Major cities also have an extra tier of local government named Circoscrizione di Decentramento Comunale or, in some cities (e.g. Rome) Municipio.

Latvia

Latvia is a unitary state, currently divided into 110 municipalities and 9 republican cities with their own council.

Liechtenstein
Liechtenstein is divided into eleven municipalities (Gemeinden singular Gemeinde), most consisting of only a single town.

Lithuania

Lithuania has a three-tier division of local government: the country is divided into 10 counties (Lithuanian: singular – apskritis, plural – apskritys) that are further subdivided into 60 municipalities (Lithuanian: singular – savivaldybė, plural – savivaldybės) which consist of over 500 elderships (Lithuanian: singular – seniūnija, plural – seniūnijos).

The counties are ruled by county governors (Lithuanian: apskrities viršininkas) appointed by the central government, and effectively oversee the two lower tiers of local government.

Municipalities are the most important administrative unit of local government. Each municipality has its own government and council, with elections taking place every four years. The mayor, who is a member of the council, is elected directly by the residents in a majority vote. The council appoints elders to govern the elderships.

Elderships, numbering over 500, are the smallest units of local government. They provide public services such as registering births and deaths and identifying individuals or families in need of welfare.

Malta
Malta is a unitary city state divided into 68 municipalities (local councils), according to the constitution of the Malta.

Netherlands

The Netherlands has three tiers of local government: national, provincial, municipal and water board.

The Netherlands is divided into twelve provinces (provincie, pl. provincies). They form the tier of administration between the central government and the municipalities. Each province is governed by a provincial council, the States-Provincial (Provinciale Staten, abbr. to PS). Its members are elected every four years. The day-to-day management of the province is in the hands of the provincial executive, the States Deputed (Gedeputeerde Staten, abbr. to GS). Members of the executive are chosen by the provincial council. The size of the executive varies from one province to another. In Flevoland, the smallest of the Dutch provinces, it has four members, while most other provinces have six or seven. Meetings of the provincial executive are chaired by the King's Commissioner (Commissaris van de Koning(in), abbr. to CvdK). The King's Commissioner is not elected by the residents of the province, but appointed by the Crown (the King and government ministers). The appointment is for six years and may be extended by a second term. The King's Commissioner can be dismissed only by the Crown. King's Commissioners play an important part in the appointment of municipal mayors. When a vacancy arises, the King's Commissioner first asks the municipal council for its views as to a successor, then writes to the Minister of the Interior recommending a candidate.

Municipalities (gemeente, pl. gemeenten) form the lowest tier of government in the Netherlands, after the central government and the provinces. There are 415 of them (1 January 2012). The municipal council (gemeenteraad) is the highest authority in the municipality. Its members are elected every four years. The role of the municipal council is comparable to that of the board of an organisation or institution. Its main job is to decide the municipality's broad policies and to oversee their implementation. The day-to-day administration of the municipality is in the hands of the municipal executive (college van burgemeester en wethouders, abbr. to (college van) B&W), made up of the mayor (burgemeester) and the aldermen (wethouder, pl. wethouders). The executive implements national legislation on matters such as social assistance, unemployment benefits and environmental management. It also bears primary responsibility for the financial affairs of the municipality and for its personnel policies. Aldermen are appointed by the council. Councillors can be chosen to act as aldermen. In that case, they lose their seats on the council and their places are taken by other representatives of the same political parties. Non-councillors can also be appointed. Unlike councillors and aldermen, mayors are not elected (not even indirectly), but are appointed by the Crown. Mayors chair both the municipal council and the executive. They have a number of statutory powers and responsibilities of their own. They are responsible for maintaining public order and safety within the municipality and frequently manage the municipality's public relations. As Crown appointees, mayors also have some responsibility for overseeing the work of the municipality, its policies and relations with other government bodies. Although they are obliged to carry out the decisions of the municipal council and executive, they may recommend that the Minister of the Interior quash any decision that they believe to be contrary to the law or against the public interest. Mayors are invariably appointed for a period of six years. They can be dismissed only by the Crown and not by the municipal council.

Water boards (waterschap and hoogheemraadschap, pl. waterschappen and hoogheemraadschappen) are among the oldest government authorities in the Netherlands. They literally form the foundation of the whole Dutch system of local government; from time immemorial they have shouldered the responsibility for water management for the residents of their area. In polders this mainly involves regulating the water level. It has always been in the common interest to keep water out and polder residents have always had to work together. That is what led to the creation of water boards. The structure of the water boards varies, but they all have a general administrative body and an executive board (college van dijkgraaf en heemraden) consisting of a chairperson (dijkgraaf) and other members ((hoog)heemraad, pl. (hoog)heemraden). The chairperson also presides the general administrative body. This body consists of people representing the various categories of stakeholders: landholders, leaseholders, owners of buildings, companies and, since recently, all the residents as well. Importance and financial contribution decide how many representatives each category may delegate. Certain stakeholders (e.g. environmental organisations) may be given the power to appoint members. The general administrative body elects the executive board from among its members. The government appoints the chairperson for a period of six years. The general administrative body is elected for a period of four years. In the past the administrative body was elected as individuals but from 2009 they will be elected as party representatives.

Norway
Norway's regional administration is organised in 19 counties (fylke), with 18 of them subdivided into 431 municipalities (kommune) per 1 January 2006. The municipal sector is a provider of vital services to the Norwegian public, accounting for about 20% of Norwegian GNP and 24% of total employment. Norway had 435 municipalities of varying size in 2003, each administered by an elected municipal council. They are grouped into 19 counties (fylker), each governed by an elected county council. Each county is headed by a governor appointed by the king in council. Oslo is the only urban center that alone constitutes a county; the remaining 18 counties consist of both urban and rural areas. County and municipal councils are popularly elected every four years. The municipalities have wide powers over the local economy, with the state exercising strict supervision. They have the right to tax and to use their resources to support education, libraries, social security, and public works such as streetcar lines, gas and electricity works, roads, and town planning, but they are usually aided in these activities by state funds.

Portugal

Currently, mainland Portugal is divided into 18 districts (in Portuguese, distritos). Each district takes the name of their respective capital city.  Insular Portugal, comprising the two Atlantic archipelagos of the Azores and Madeira, is organized as two autonomous regions (in Portuguese, regiões autónomas).

Each district and each Autonomous region is divided into municipalities (in Portuguese, municípios) which, in turn, are subdivided into parishes (in Portuguese, freguesias).

Since 1976, when the two Autonomous regions of Portugal were established, the Azores and Madeira are no longer divided into districts.

Poland

Poland has three levels of subdivision. The territory of Poland is divided into 16 voivodeships (provinces); these are further divided into 379 powiats (counties or districts), and these in turn are divided into 2,479 gminas (communes or municipalities). Major cities normally have the status of both gmina and powiat.

Each voivodeship is jointly governed by the National-government appointed voivode and a locally elected sejmik (provincial assembly), which appoints an executive board led by a voivodeship marshal.

Russia

The Russian Federation consistes of eighty-five federal subjects that are constituent members of the Federation.  However, two of these federal subjects — the Republic of Crimea and the federal city of Sevastopol—are internationally recognized as part of Ukraine. All federal subjects are of equal federal rights in the sense that they have equal representation—two delegates each—in the Federation Council (upper house of the Federal Assembly). But they do differ in the degree of autonomy they enjoy.

The modern administrative-territorial structures of the federal subjects vary significantly from one federal subject to another. While the implementation details may be considerably different, in general, however, the following types of high-level administrative divisions are recognized:
administrative districts (raions)
cities/towns and urban-type settlements of federal subject significance
closed administrative-territorial formations

Typical lower-level administrative divisions include:
selsoviets (rural councils)
towns and urban-type settlements of the administrative district significance
city districts

Spain

Spain is divided into 17 autonomous communities, which in turn are divided into 50 provinces. There are also two autonomous cities: those of Ceuta and Melilla. Finally, each province comprises a number of municipalities.

Each administrative entity is given powers, structure, and boundaries by a law that was passed by the Prime Minister .

Law 7/1985, passed by the former Spanish Prime Minister Felipe González Márquez (socialist), lays down the procedure of the Local Government. Every city in Spain used this Law until 2003. This year, the former Spanish Prime Minister José María Aznar López (conservative), passed a Law (57/2003) to modernize organic rules of those cities which had more than 250,000 inhabitants, and other important cities (like capital cities of provinces with at least 175,000 inhabitants). Also, it exists two other important Laws for specifically Madrid (Law 22/2006) and Barcelona (Law 1/2006). The main governing body in most municipalities is called Ayuntamiento (in the less populated municipalities an alternative local organization system called open council, "concejo abierto", is used). The Ayuntamiento in turn is formed by the Plenary (el Pleno, the collective formed by the city councillors) and the Mayor. The number of members that compose The Plenary varies depending on city's population (for example, since 2007 Valencia has 33 members and Pamplona has 27). The name given to the members of the Plenary is councillor (concejal). Those councillors are elected between city's inhabitants every four years by direct vote. After being elected, councillors meet in a special Plenary session to determine who will be elected, between them, as city's Mayor. In the next days after the election, the mayor chooses some councillors to set up the executive governing body (Junta de Gobierno or Comisión de Gobierno). After that, and for the next four years, city's mayor and the Junta de Gobierno will govern over the city according to their competences (urbanism, some taxes, local police, licenses for specific activities, cleaning services, etc.). Meanwhile, councillors in the Plenary but not part of the Junta de Gobierno (the opposition) will oversee Mayor's rule.
The autonomous community of Catalonia is divided in 4 provinces and more than 900 municipalities. Between these two tiers, there are 41 comarques (singular, comarca), roughly equivalent to 'district' or 'county'. The comarca is a commonwealth, or union, of municipalities with competences in several fields (Law 6/1987 of the Parliament of Catalonia).

Sweden

Every fourth year general elections are held in Sweden to elect members of the national parliament, 20 county council assemblies and 290 municipal assemblies. As the parliament elects the national government, the local assemblies elect their executive committees and their boards. Members in local committees and boards are elected proportionally by the political parties in the assemblies, giving all the major parties representation. The parties usually cooperate well on the local levels.

The county councils (landsting) are responsible for health care and usually provide transportation.

The municipalities (kommuner) are responsible for:
social services, childcare, preschool, elderly care
primary and secondary education
planning and building
health protection, water, sewerage, refuse, emergency services

On a voluntary basis, the municipalities provide sports, culture, housing, energy as well as commercial service.

The activities are financed by income taxes. Swedes pay around 20% of their taxable income to the municipality and around 11% to the county council. (The national government is financed by VAT and payroll taxes and fees.)

Ukraine

United Kingdom
The system of local government is different in each of the four home nations of the UK. In total there are 426 local authorities in the UK. 346 of these are in England, 11 in Northern Ireland, 32 in Scotland and 22 are in Wales.

England

The most complex system is in England, the result of numerous reforms and reorganisation over the centuries.
The top-level of sub-national administration within England until the end of March 2012 consisted of the nine regions. The regions were used by central government for various statistical purposes, and Government Offices for the English Regions and assorted other institutions including Regional Development Agencies. Regional Government Offices, Regional Development Agencies and Regional Ministers were all abolished by the Cameron ministry in 2010. Only the London region which is a sub-region compared to the other regions of England has a directly elected government.  Only one regional referendum has been held to date to seek consent for the introduction of direct elections elsewhere — By John Prescott in the northeast of England — and this was initially rejected by the people of the North East in 2004.

The layers of elected local government vary. In different areas the highest tier of elected local government may be:
counties, which may be
single-tier unitary authorities, or
divided into districts (also known as boroughs in some areas)
districts, which are separate unitary authorities in some areas
metropolitan districts (also called metropolitan boroughs) in some areas which are similar to unitary authorities, but have joint boards with other districts in the same metropolitan county
Greater London, which is divided into 32 London boroughs and the City of London

In most areas there is a lower tier of government, civil parishes, with unlimited functions & powers under the 2011 Localism Act.

Most civil parishes are in rural areas, but if the parish is a town the parish council may be called a town council. In a few cases the parish is a city, and the parish council is called a city council.

Metropolitan counties, and a few non-metropolitan counties, no longer have elected councils or administrative functions, and their former functions are performed by districts. Such counties remain ceremonial counties.

Northern Ireland

Since 1 April 2015 Northern Ireland is divided into 11 districts. Local government in Northern Ireland does not carry out the same range of functions as those in the rest of the United Kingdom.

Scotland

Local government in Scotland is arranged on the lines of unitary authorities, with the nation divided into 32 council areas.

Wales

Wales has a uniform system of 22 unitary authorities, variously styled as county, county borough, city or city and county local authorities. There are also communities, equivalent to parishes.

North America

Canada

Canada has a federal system with three orders of government. The largest is the federal government, followed by the provincial and local governments. Municipal governments are separately elected. They must follow laws and guidelines as set out by their province, but are allowed to pass additional by-laws and acts unique to them.

Mexico
Mexico is a Federal Republic made up by 31 states and a federal district. Each state is divided in municipios, while the federal district is divided in sixteen delegaciones. Twenty-nine states of Mexico were created as administrative divisions by the constitution of 1917, which grants them those powers not expressly vested in the federal government; Mexico's two remaining territories, Baja California Sur and Quintana Roo, achieved statehood on 9 October 1974, raising the total to 31. Each state has a constitution, a governor elected for six years, and a unicameral legislature, with representatives elected by district vote in proportion to population. An ordinary session of the legislature is held annually, and extraordinary sessions may be called by the governor or the permanent committee. Bills may be introduced by legislators, by the governor, by the state supreme court, and by municipalities (a unit comparable to a US county). In addition to the 31 states, there is also one federal district comprising Mexico City, whose governor serves as a member of the cabinet. Many state services are supported by federal subsidies.

The principal unit of state government is the municipality. Mexico's 2,378 municipalities are governed by municipal presidents and municipal councils. State governors generally select the nominees for the municipal elections. Municipal budgets are approved by the respective state governors. Until 1997, the president appointed the mayor of Mexico City. Political reforms allowed the first open elections in 1997, and Cuauhtémoc Cardenas Solórzano became Mexico City's first elected mayor.

United States

Local government in the United States refers to governmental jurisdictions below the level of the state. Most states have at least two tiers of local government: counties and municipalities. In some states, counties are divided into townships. There are several different types of jurisdictions at the municipal level, including the city, town, parish, borough, village, reservations and boundaries.  The types and nature of these municipal entities varies from state to state.

Oceania

Australia

Local government is the third type of government in Australia, after Federal and State.

New Zealand

New Zealand has a local government system comprising two complementary sets of local authorities—regional councils and territorial authorities. There are 78 local authorities consisting of:
11 regional councils, which cover much of New Zealand's land area, and
67 territorial authorities (comprising 53 district councils, 12 city councils and 2 other councils).
Six of the territorial authorities are unitary authorities, which also have the powers of a regional council. They are Auckland Council, Nelson City Council, the Gisborne, Marlborough and Tasman district councils, and Chatham Islands Council.

Regional council areas are based on water catchment areas, whereas territorial authorities are based on community of interest and road access. Within a regional council area there are usually many city or district councils, although city and district councils can be in multiple regional council areas.

South America

Argentina
Argentina is a federation of 23 provinces and the federal capital of Buenos Aires. During the 19th century there was a bitter struggle between Buenos Aires and the interior provinces, and there has long been an element of tension regarding the division of powers between the central government and provincial bodies. The federal government retains control over such matters as the regulation of commerce, customs collections, currency, civil or commercial codes, or the appointment of foreign agents. The provincial governors are elected every four years.

The constitutional "national intervention" and "state of siege" powers of the president have been invoked frequently. The first of these powers was designed to "guarantee the republican form of government in the provinces." Since the adoption of the 1853 constitution, the federal government has intervened over 200 times, mostly by presidential decree. Under this authority, provincial and municipal offices may be declared vacant, appointments annulled, and local elections supervised. Between 1966 and 1973, all local legislatures were dissolved, and provincial governors were appointed by the new president. A restoration of provincial and municipal government followed the return to constitutional government in 1973. After the March 1976 coup, the federal government again intervened to remove all provincial governors and impose direct military rule over all municipalities. Since 1983, representative local government has been in force again.

Until 1996, the President appointed the mayor of Buenos Aires, and by law, the president and Congress controlled any legislation that affected the city. Constitutional reforms that year led to an elected mayoral position, and a 60-member Poder Legislativo (legislative power).

Brazil

Brazil is a federation consisting of 27 federative units: 26 states and one Federal District. Government exists at three levels: federal, state, and municipal. The states are subdivided into 5,570 municipalities, while the Federal District has no municipalities (divided into administrative regions instead) and has powers of both a state and a municipality..

Municipal government consists of an executive branch headed by a mayor (Prefeito/Prefeita), and a legislative branch (Câmara Municipal), serving four-year terms. Municipalities are enshrined in the constitution of 1988 as entities of the federation; their responsibilities are distinct from the other two levels in theory, but overlap in practice (e.g. education, health, transportation). With their broad powers, municipalities may create their own constitutions, termed organic law, and cannot be overruled by state governments.

Elections at the municipal level follow a similar, partisan system to state and federal elections, but take place in different years. Municipalities may have anywhere from 9 to 55 members of the Câmara Municipal, depending on the population. There is no minimum or maximum population requirement for municipalities: while the average population of a municipality in 2005 was 30,099, Borá, São Paulo state (the least populous) had only 823 inhabitants, while São Paulo (the largest) had 10.9 million inhabitants. Municipalities within a state may choose to merge or separate with approval in a plebiscite and enacting of a state law.

Paraguay
Paraguay is divided into 17 departments, which are subdivided into districts, which, in turn, comprise municipalities (the minimum requirement for a municipality is 3,000 persons) and rural districts (partidos). A governor, elected by popular vote, runs each department. Municipal government is exercised through a municipal board, chosen by direct election, and an executive department. In the principal cities and capitals, the executive department is headed by a mayor appointed by the minister of the interior; in other localities, the mayor is appointed by the presidents of the municipal boards. Police chiefs are appointed by the central government.

Peru
Peru is divided into 25 regions and the province of Lima. Each region has an elected government composed of a president and council that serve four-year terms. These governments plan regional development, execute public investment projects, promote economic activities, and manage public property.  The province of Lima is administered by a city council. The goal of devolving power to regional and municipal governments was among others to improve popular participation. NGOs played an important role in the decentralisation process and still influence local politics.

Uruguay
Uruguay's administrative subdivisions consisted of nineteen territories called departments and governed by intendencias, which were subordinate to the central government and responsible for local administration. They enforced national laws and administered the nation's social and educational policies and institutions within their territories. These territories had limited taxing powers, but they could borrow funds and acquire property. They also had the power to establish unpaid five-member local boards or town councils in municipalities other than the departmental capital if the population was large enough to warrant such a body.

Executive authority was vested in a governor (intendente), who administered the department, and in a thirty-one-member departmental board (junta departmental), which carried out legislative functions. These functions included approval of the departmental budget and judicial actions, such as impeachment proceedings against departmental officials, including the governor. At the municipal level, a mayor (intendente municipal) assumed executive and administrative duties, carrying out resolutions made by the local board (whose members were appointed on the basis of proportional representation of the political parties). The governor was required to comply with and enforce the constitution and the laws and to promulgate the decrees enacted by the departmental board. The governor was authorized to prepare the budget, submit it for approval to the departmental board, appoint the board's employees, and, if necessary, discipline or suspend them. The governor represented the department in its relations with the national government and other departmental governments and in the negotiation of contracts with public or private agencies.

Like the governor, the members of the departmental board and the mayor were elected for five-year terms in direct, popular elections. A governor could be reelected only once, and candidates for the post had to meet the same requirements as those for a senator, in addition to being a native of the department or a resident therein for at least three years before assuming office. Departmental board members had to be at least twenty-three years of age, native born (or a legal citizen for at least three years), and a native of the department (or a resident for at least three years).

The board sat in the capital city of each department and exercised jurisdiction throughout the entire territory of the department. It could issue decrees and resolutions that it deemed necessary either on the suggestion of the governor or on its own initiative. It could approve budgets, fix the amount of taxes, request the intervention of the Accounts Tribunal for advice concerning departmental finances or administration, and remove from office—at the request of the governor—members of nonelective local departmental boards. The board also supervised local public services; public health; and primary, secondary, preparatory, industrial, and artistic education. Although Montevideo was the smallest department in terms of area (divided into twenty-three geographic zones that generally coincided with the electoral zones), its departmental board had sixty-five members in 1990; all other departments had thirty-one-member boards and a five-member executive council appointed by the departmental board, with proportional representation from the principal political parties.

Data as of December 1990

References

Further reading
Kemp, Roger L. Managing America's Cities: A Handbook for Local Government Productivity, McFarland and Co., Jefferson, NC, USA, and London, Eng., UK 1998.
Kemp, Roger L. Model Government Charters: A City, County, Regional, State, and Federal Handbook, McFarland and Co., Jefferson, NC, USA, and London, Eng., UK, 2003.
Kemp, Roger L. Forms of Local Government: A Handbook on City, County and Regional Options, McFarland and Co., Jefferson, NC, USA, and London, Eng., UK, 2007.
Lockner, Allyn O. Steps to Local Government Reform: A Guide to Tailoring Local Government Reforms to Fit Regional Governance Communities in Democracies. iUniverse, Bloomington, Indiana, USA, 2013.

External links

Department of Local and Regional Democracy and Good Governance—Council of Europe
The Congress in brief
Rural local self-government challenges and development prospects by Rukhman Adukov

 Using a Model Municipal Performance Measurement System to Assess Mid-sized Texas Cities.
Factors Contributing to Municipal Annexation among Medium Sized Southern US Cities.  Colin Rice
United Cities and Local Governments  is an organisation for cities, local governments and municipal associations throughout the world.
Agenda 21 for culture  is the reference document for cultural programmes of local authorities
Rural Decentralization and Local Governance provides free access to selected e-resources and news on local governance in developing countries.
Governance From Below Free to download studies, papers, data, and other resources on local government, decentralization and federalism.

 
Decentralization
Government